Robert Goldberg may refer to:

 Robert L. Goldberg, attorney in Rostker v. Goldberg, a decision of the United States Supreme Court
 Robert Alan Goldberg (born 1949), American historian
 Robert P. Goldberg (1944–1994), American computer scientist